Eugène Halphen (5 July 1820 – 27 December 1912) was a French historian, poet and book editor.

Early life
Eugène Halphen was born on 5 July 1820 in Paris, France.

Career
Halphen was a historian. He also composed poetry under the pen name of Ugenic Phanhel.

Halphen was also a book editor. He edited the letters of poet Nicolas Rapin to his son. He also edited the letters written by Henry IV of France to Maximilien de Béthune, Duke of Sully. Additionally, he edited the diary of Robert Arnauld d'Andilly

Death
Halphen died on 27 December 1912 in Paris, France.

Works

As an author

As an editor

References

1820 births
1912 deaths
French Jews
Writers from Paris
19th-century French historians
French book editors
French male poets
French male non-fiction writers